Emil Neidenbach (15 June 1884 – 20 December 1957) was a Hungarian writer. His work was part of the literature event in the art competition at the 1932 Summer Olympics.

References

1884 births
1957 deaths
20th-century Hungarian male writers
Olympic competitors in art competitions
People from Timiș County